Carla Cristina Paquete Sacramento OIH (born 10 December 1971 in São Sebastião da Pedreira) is a middle distance runner from Portugal.

Biography
Sacramento won medals at a variety of distances but her speciality is the 1500 m. She won the IAAF World Championships in Athletics in 1997 in Athens after having won a bronze medal in the 1995 championships.

Sacramento won her first national title in 1986 when she was only fifteen years old.  She and Fernanda Ribeiro both excelled at a national level as young girls and have dominated Portuguese middle and long distance running since.  Sacramento has run under 2 minutes for 800 m and 4 minutes for 1500 m many times, both of which marks are thought of as benchmarks of world class running.

Sacramento competes for the Portuguese club Maratona Clube de Portugal but lives in Madrid.  Her family is of Sao Tome origin.  A track was named in her honour in Portugal.

Sacramento won the inaugural edition of the Oeiras International Cross Country race in 2000.

Major achievements

 In addition, she finished in the top ten at the World Cross Country Championships.

Personal bests
400 m 54.07 (1997)
800 m 1:58.94 (1997)
1500 m 3:57.71 (1998)
3000 m 8:30.22 (1999)
5000 m 15:52.54 (2000)
10 km 33:46(1997)

References

External links
 
 
 

1971 births
Living people
Portuguese female middle-distance runners
Athletes (track and field) at the 1992 Summer Olympics
Athletes (track and field) at the 1996 Summer Olympics
Athletes (track and field) at the 2000 Summer Olympics
Athletes (track and field) at the 2004 Summer Olympics
Olympic athletes of Portugal
Golden Globes (Portugal) winners
World Athletics Championships medalists
European Athletics Championships medalists
Universiade medalists in athletics (track and field)
Portuguese people of Cape Verdean descent
Goodwill Games medalists in athletics
Universiade silver medalists for Portugal
World Athletics Championships winners
Medalists at the 1997 Summer Universiade
Competitors at the 2001 Goodwill Games
Athletes from Lisbon